The Vought YA-7F "Strikefighter" is a prototype transonic attack aircraft based on the subsonic A-7 Corsair II. Two prototypes were converted from A-7Ds. The YA-7F was not ordered into production, its intended role being filled by the F-16 Fighting Falcon.

Design and development

In 1985, the USAF requested proposals for a fast strike aircraft because of concerns that A-10 Thunderbolt II was too slow for interdiction. The design called for a new engine, either the Pratt & Whitney F100-PW-220 or General Electric F110-GE-100. LTV responded with the YA-7F, a supersonic version of A-7 powered by an F100-PW-220 with 26,000 lbf (116 kN) thrust. During the development process, Aviation Week & Space Technology magazine reported that, early on, LTV also experimented with adapting the afterburner from an F100-PW-220 to the existing Allison TF41 engine. Because the TF41 had a higher bypass ratio, the addition of the afterburner produced a much higher thrust (26,000lbf) than the F100 could produce (which was 23,770lbf), while retaining the greater fuel economy of the TF41. To accommodate the longer engine, the fuselage was lengthened about 4 ft (1.22 m). New fuselage sections were inserted in both the forward and aft fuselage – a 30 in (76 cm) section in front of the wing and an 18 in (46 cm) section behind the wing. The reasons were three-fold: (1) to accommodate engine length issues, (2) to accommodate aerodynamic issues with shape, and (3) to accommodate weight distribution issues. The increase in internal volume allowed for more fuel and other stores improvements. The wing was strengthened and fitted with new augmented flaps, leading edge extensions and automatic maneuvering flaps.

The vertical stabilizer height was increased about 10 in (25 cm), the unit horizontal tail was flipped from dihedral to anhedral, and control surfaces were flattened. The end result resembled the supersonic F-8 Crusader from which the original subsonic A-7 was derived. Many of the vehicle systems and mission systems were heavily modified and upgraded with leading edge technology, including a Molecular Sieve Oxygen Generating System and better cockpit displays. Low Altitude Night Attack Systems, an improved HUD and many software enhancements for navigation and weapons delivery were planned and being designed concurrently by Vought Dallas.

The YA-7F modifications allowed 7-g turn and burn capability that permitted high-speed sustained evasive maneuvers plus great improvements in high angle of attack performance. As a CAS/BAI platform to penetrate into enemy territory and return safely, the "Strikefighter" moniker was most fitting. Two A-7Ds were extensively modified, the first one flying on 29 November 1989, and breaking the sound barrier on its second flight. The second prototype flew on 3 April 1990.

The project was canceled due to improved relations with former adversaries, lower defense budgets, and the Air National Guard, by then the principal US operator of the A-7, generally favoring the in-production F-16 Fighting Falcon.

Variants

YA-7F (A-7D Plus / A-7 Strikefighter)
Stretched, supersonic version of A-7 powered by a Pratt & Whitney F100-220 turbofan, optimized for interdiction role, but cancelled after only two were built.

Operators

 United States Air Force

Aircraft on display
70-1039 – Hill Aerospace Museum, Hill AFB, Utah.
71-0344 – Air Force Flight Test Center Museum, Edwards AFB, California.

Specifications (YA-7F)

See also

References

Notes

Bibliography

NAVAIR 01-45AAA-1, A-7A/B Flight Manual. US Navy, 15 August 1973.
NAVAIR 01-45AAE-1, A-7C/E Flight Manual. US Navy, 1 March 1973.
Donald, David and Jon Lake, eds. Encyclopedia of World Military Aircraft. London: AIRtime Publishing, 1996. .
Dorr, Robert F. "A Plus for the Corsair". Air International, August 1987, Vol 33 No. 2. Bromley, UK:Fine Scroll. . pp. 61–65, 84–87, 93.
Higham, Robin and Carol Williams. Flying Combat Aircraft of USAAF-USAF (Volume 2). Andrews AFB, Maryland: Air Force Historical Foundation, 1978. .
Hobson, Chris. Vietnam Air Losses, USAF/USN/USMC, Fixed-Wing Aircraft Losses in Southeast Asia, 1961–1973. North Branch, Minnesota: Specialty Press, 2001. .
Swanborough, Gordon and Peter M. Bowers. United States Military Aircraft Since 1909. Washington, DC: Smithsonian Books, 1989. .
Swanborough, Gordon and Peter M. Bowers. United States Navy Aircraft Since 1911. London: Putnam, Second edition, 1976. .
Swanborough, Gordon and Peter M. Bowers. United States Navy Aircraft Since 1911. Annapolis, Maryland: Naval Institute Press, 1990. .
Wings of Eagles

External links

 Vought Heritage YA-7F page
 YA-7F Prototype at Hill AFB Museum
 Joe Baugher's website on the Ling-Temco-Vought YA-7F Corsair II

A-7F Strikefighter
1980s United States attack aircraft
Single-engined jet aircraft
High-wing aircraft
Cancelled military aircraft projects of the United States
Aircraft first flown in 1989